Elif Zeynep Celep (born 1 January 1994) is a former Turkish individual rhythmic gymnast who now competes for Azerbaijan. She represents her nation at international competitions. She competed at world championships, including at the 2015 World Rhythmic Gymnastics Championships.

References

External links
 
 AGF National team
 WorldOfGymnastics.info
 News.az Azerbaijani gymnast claims bronze in Spain
 Today.Az Day 1 of FIG World Cup Final in Rhythmic Gymnastics kicks off in Baku

1994 births
Living people
Azerbaijani rhythmic gymnasts
Place of birth missing (living people)
Turkish rhythmic gymnasts
Sportspeople from Baku